Trzy Kawki (Polish for "Three Jackdaws") is a Polish coat of arms. It was used by the noble family of Borch.

History

Blazon
Argent, three jackdaws sable

Notable bearers

Notable bearers of this coat of arms have included:

 Count Jan Andrzej Józef Borch h. Trzy Kawki 
 Jan Andrzej Borch, Kanclerz
 Teodor, Bishop of Poznan

Reference in literature

A bearer of the "Trzy Kawki" coat of arms is the fictional knight, Borch, in Andrzej Sapkowski's novel.

See also
 Polish heraldry
 Heraldic family
 List of Polish nobility coats of arms

Bibliography
 Kasper Niesiecki: Herbarz polski... powiększony dodatkami z późniejszych autorów, rękopismów, dowodów urzędowych, wyd. J. N. Bobrowicz, t. 1-10, Lipsk 1839–1845,

References

External links
 http://ebuw.uw.edu.pl/dlibra/publication?id=166&tab=3

Trzy Kawki